Brian David Hood (born November 16, 1986) is an American record producer and owner of 456 Recording Studio in Nashville, Tennessee. He is the former and original drummer of Solid State Records band MyChildren MyBride. He has worked with a number of prominent bands, most notably Memphis May Fire, Erra, Sworn In, Crystal Lake, A Plea for Purging, Invent Animate, Being as an Ocean, The Crimson Armada, and Gideon.

Production discography

Aerial - Foresight (mixing/mastering)
A Night In Texas - The God Delusion (mixing/mastering)
A Plea for Purging (Facedown Records)
Arras - Hanging On (mixing/mastering)
As Hell Retreats (Facedown Records)
Before There Was Rosalyn (Victory Records)
Being As An Ocean - Dear G-D (InVogue Records)
Capsize (Equal Vision Records)
Crystal Lake - The Fire Inside / Overcome (Artery Recordings)
 Erra (Tragic Hero Records)
Eskimo Callboy (Earache Records) (mastering only)
Evil Prevails - Dirt and decay (mastering only)
For All Eternity - Beyond The Gates (Taperjean Records), Metanoia (Facedown Records)
Gideon (Facedown Records)
Greg the Hero - Of Defiance
His Statue Falls - Mistaken For Trophies (Redfield Records) (mastering only)
Hollow City  
Hope for the Dying (Facedown Records)
Iconoclast - HalluciNation
In Search of Solace - From Me//From Within, Regression Progression
Invent, Animate (Tragic Hero Records)
Memphis May Fire (Rise Records) - Unconditional (remixing/remastering)
Prepared Like A Bride - A Dangerous Journey
Sentinel - The Primordial Ruin (mixing/mastering)
Sirens & Sailors (Artery Recordings)
Speech Patterns (mixing/mastering)
Suasion (mixing/mastering)
Surroundings - Of Bane, Burden & Change (mixing/mastering)
Sworn In (Razor & Tie Records)
The Crimson Armada (Artery Recordings)
The Devil Wears Prada (drum editing only)
Wake Into The Nightmare

References

1986 births
Place of birth missing (living people)
Living people
American record producers
American audio engineers